SRSQ (pronounced "seer-skew") is the solo musical project of Texas-based musician Kennedy Ashlyn, formerly the vocalist and keyboardist for Santa Cruz, California duo Them Are Us Too. After Ashlyn's partner in that duo, Cash Askew, died in the Ghost Ship warehouse fire in 2016, Ashlyn retired their shared name and started making music as SRSQ. Her solo debut album, Unreality, was released on October 26, 2018, and her second album, Ever Crashing, was released on August 19, 2022, both by Dais Records.

Early life 
Ashlyn, full name Kennedy Ashlyn Wenning, started off in music singing in a choir at age 5. She performed in musical theater and show choir in school and took a year of opera training in college. She started making noise pop music solo under the Them Are Us Too name in high school. Growing up, Ashlyn's favorite band was the B-52's, and she also grew up listening bands such as Cocteau Twins, Dead Can Dance, and the Sundays, music she picked up on from her mom's taste.

Ashlyn went to college at University of California, Santa Cruz, living in a house. Her housemates offered to host their friend Askew's 19th birthday party in 2012. The party was goth-themed, with an Askew-curated soundtrack including Cocteau Twins, Depeche Mode, and the Sisters of Mercy. Neither Ashlyn nor Askew were goths, but they shared interest in the music and aesthetic which none of their other friends did. Less than 24 hours later, after performing her third-ever solo show, Ashlyn asked Askew to join Them Are Us Too.

Career

Them Are Us Too 
The duo recorded a demo together and toured the West Coast. They signed to Dais Records and both dropped out of school. Dais released their debut album, Remain, on March 24, 2015, when the duo were both 21 years old. They toured more and worked on more music, but never released a second album together. On December 2, 2016, a fire broke out at the former warehouse-turned-concert venue the Ghost Ship in Fruitvale, Oakland, California. Askew was among over 30 people who died in the fire, with her body having been identified two days after. Ashlyn's last conversation with Askew, from earlier in the day of the fire, was about a demo the latter had recorded for the song "No One", the first song Askew had written for the duo.

Ashlyn, having moved to Dallas the previous year, flew back to Oakland immediately, staying at Askew's girlfriend Anya Dross's house. The two started making music together before Ashlyn returned to Dallas the following January. She spent most of the subsequent six months in bed, accomplishing little beyond her debut SRSQ show in May 2017. She has said she remembers little of that period, even what songs she performed at the May concert. After a time working as SRSQ, Ashlyn got back in the studio with Dross and Askew's stepfather Sunny Haire to record one last Them Are Us Too release. That album, Amends, was released on June 29, 2018, by Dais. Amends consists mainly of songs written by the duo which were planned to be on their eventual second album, with the closing title track having been written by Ashlyn as her "own goodbye to the project and to Cash." The album also includes a finished version of "No One" with lead vocals by Dross. With the release of Amends, Ashlyn officially retired Them Are Us Too and moved fully into SRSQ.

Personal life 
Ashlyn currently lives in Dallas, Texas after having moved to the state in 2015.

Discography

Albums 
 Unreality (2018, Dais Records)
 Ever Crashing (2022, Dais Records)

EPs 
 "Unreality" Live Sessions (2020)

Singles

References 

Living people
Year of birth missing (living people)
Musicians from Santa Cruz, California
Musicians from Dallas
Singers from California
Singers from Texas
American keyboardists
Dais Records artists
University of California, Santa Cruz alumni